Mandar Bhandari (born 15 June 1994) is an Indian cricketer who plays for Maharashtra. He made his List-A debut for Maharashtra against Goa in the 2018-19 Vijay Hazare Trophy on 19 September 2018. He made his first-class debut for Maharashtra in the 2018–19 Ranji Trophy on 22 December 2018.

References

External links

Indian cricketers
1994 births
Living people
Cricketers from Maharashtra
Maharashtra cricketers